Pleurothrips is a genus of thrips in the family Phlaeothripidae.

Species
 Pleurothrips collaris

References

Phlaeothripidae
Thrips
Thrips genera